John Acheson may refer to:
 John Acheson (actor) (1934–1997), British actor
 John Acheson (goldsmith), Scottish goldsmith